Bryan Elsley (born 17 May 1961 in Dalkeith, Midlothian) is a Scottish television writer, best known for the co-creation of E4 teen drama Skins with his son, Jamie Brittain. Other television dramas include Rose and Maloney, The Young Person's Guide to Becoming a Rock Star, The Crow Road, Dates, and Kiss Me First.

Early life and education
Elsley attended Dalkeith High School before going on to read English and History at the Alcuin College, University of York in York, England, where he graduated with a B.A. in 1982.

Career
While a student at the University of York, Elsley met and collaborated with Harry Enfield. They created a comedy duo, "Dusty and Dick", and performed a sell out show at the Edinburgh Festival Fringe.

Elsley took up a career in theatrical writing, and then pursued television writing after parting from Enfield. For three years, Elsley was artistic director of Pocket Theatre Cumbria, which was based at Kendal's Brewery Arts Centre. At that time he was also writing episodes for TV series Casualty and London's Burning. These, and his short film Govan Ghost Story (1989), opened up other opportunities for other television writing.  Elsley's big break came when he was commissioned by the BBC to adapt Iain Banks's novel The Crow Road for television.

On 18 March 2010, Elsey announced via the Skins blog that the final episode of series 4 was his last as a writer for the UK series, although Elsley did return to write the opening episode for series 6 in 2012. He executive produced Skins U.S. in 2011.

Personal life
Elsley has five children and currently lives in Kentish Town, London.

Film and television work 
 The Crow Road (1996) 
 The Young Person's Guide to Becoming a Rock Star (1998) 
 Nature Boy (1999) 
 Complicity (2000)
 40 (2003)
 Rose and Maloney (2002–2005)
 Skins (2007–2013)
 Skins U.S. (2011)
 Dates (2013)
 Clique (2016)
 Kiss Me First (2018)

References

External links
 

1961 births
Living people
People from Dalkeith
Alumni of the University of York
Scottish television writers